Hernán Arsenio Pérez González (born 25 February 1989) is a Paraguayan professional footballer who plays for the Paraguay national team as a right winger.

Club career

Early years
Pérez was born in Fernando de la Mora, Asunción. After playing for two other youth clubs he finished his development with Tacuary, where he made his Paraguayan Primera División debut in 2007.

Subsequently, Pérez was signed by Club Libertad in the same league, appearing rarely for them due to a serious right knee injury.

Villarreal
On 30 July 2009, Villarreal CF from Spain bought Pérez, who signed a five-year contract. He spent two full seasons with the reserves in the Segunda División, starting in several of the matches he featured in.

Pérez was definitely promoted to the Valencians' first team for the 2011–12 campaign. He made his competitive debut on 27 September in the UEFA Champions League game against S.S.C. Napoli, coming on as a substitute for Jonathan de Guzmán in the dying minutes of a 2–0 group-stage away loss. Again from the bench, on 1 October, he made his first La Liga appearance: from a corner kick, in the 84th minute, he equalised it 2–2 for the hosts against Real Zaragoza.

Pérez contributed 16 appearances and two goals in 2012–13, as the Yellow Submarine finished second and returned to the top flight one year after relegating. He joined Olympiacos F.C. on 31 January 2014. He made his Super League Greece debut five days later in the 2–0 home victory over Panionios FC, and scored his first goal on 8 February in a 5–0 away rout of Veria FC.

On 30 January 2015, Pérez returned to Spain's second tier after being loaned to Real Valladolid until the end of the season.

Espanyol
On 3 July 2015, Pérez signed a four-year deal with top-division club RCD Espanyol after his contract with Villarreal expired. He quickly became a starter for the Sergio-led side and, on 21 November, took his season tally to four after scoring a brace to help down Málaga CF 2–0 at the Estadi Cornellà-El Prat.

On 12 January 2018, Pérez was loaned to Deportivo Alavés of the same tier for six months.

Qatar
On 23 July 2019, Pérez cut ties with Espanyol and agreed to a three-year contract at Al Ahli SC of the Qatar Stars League. He stayed in the country in March 2022, moving to its Second Division with Al-Markhiya SC.

International career

Pérez was one of the best players for the Paraguayan under-20 team at the 2009 South American Championship, helping the nation finish in second place by scoring five goals in seven matches and ultimately being considered one of the best players in the tournament held in Venezuela.

He made his debut for the full side the following year at the age of 21, playing the last 20 minutes of the 1–1 friendly draw with South Africa, and was selected to the 2011 Copa América in Argentina.

Honours
Olympiacos
Super League Greece: 2013–14

References

External links

1989 births
Living people
People from Fernando de la Mora, Paraguay
Paraguayan people of Spanish descent
Paraguayan footballers
Association football wingers
Paraguayan Primera División players
Club Tacuary footballers
Club Libertad footballers
La Liga players
Segunda División players
Villarreal CF B players
Villarreal CF players
Real Valladolid players
RCD Espanyol footballers
Deportivo Alavés players
Super League Greece players
Olympiacos F.C. players
Qatar Stars League players
Qatari Second Division players
Al Ahli SC (Doha) players
Al-Markhiya SC players
Campeonato Brasileiro Série A players
Coritiba Foot Ball Club players
Paraguay under-20 international footballers
Paraguay international footballers
2011 Copa América players
2019 Copa América players
Paraguayan expatriate footballers
Expatriate footballers in Spain
Expatriate footballers in Greece
Expatriate footballers in Qatar
Expatriate footballers in Brazil
Paraguayan expatriate sportspeople in Spain
Paraguayan expatriate sportspeople in Greece
Paraguayan expatriate sportspeople in Brazil